The Connecticut State Police (CSP) is a division of the Connecticut Department of Emergency Services and Public Protection responsible for traffic regulation and law enforcement across the state of Connecticut, especially in areas not served by (or served by smaller) local police departments. The CSP currently has 940 troopers as of October 8, 2020 and is headquartered in Middletown, Connecticut. The Connecticut State Police is also responsible for protecting the Governor of Connecticut, Lieutenant Governor of Connecticut, and their families.

History

Early history
The Connecticut State Police was created under House Bill #247 on May 29, 1903. Initially, five men, paid three dollars a day, were hired to enforce state liquor and vice laws, making it one of the oldest State Police forces in the nation. It was originally composed of five troopers primarily responsible for interdicting the production of moonshine. Early troopers traveled the state by railroad until automobile and motorcycle patrols were instituted, and troopers would often spend five to six days working, eating, and sleeping in the barracks constructed around the state. By 1924, seven such barracks had been built. The organization was heavily militaristic, and its internal culture was similar in this regard to other state police agencies in New England.

Modern history
In 1968 Louise Smith graduated from the State Police Academy becoming the first black woman to join a state police force in the United States.

In 1984 a federal judge found that the State Police systematically discriminated against minorities and ordered the State Police to increase the number of minorities in specialist positions as well as increase minority promotion rates.

In 1987 the Connecticut State Police were sued by the Connecticut chapter of Men and Women for Justice for discriminating against Black and Hispanic officers and officer candidates as well as other Civil Rights Act violations. The State Police chose to settle the case and made an agreement that the State Police would hire at least 10% Black and Hispanic officers, an accurate reflection of the State’s demographics in the early 1980s. In 2018 the hiring practices of the State Police remained the minimum allowed under their legally binding agreement with 5% of officers being Black and 5% being Hispanic despite Black and Hispanic Americans constituting over 25% of Connecticut's citizens in 2018.

In 1997 the Connecticut State Police was at the center of Connecticut Governor John G. Rowland’s Geargate scandal  Surplus military equipment intended for the State Police was diverted by Rowland and close associates for their personal use. Equipment and apparel including sleeping bags, camouflage jackets, helmets, and a bayonet made their way into the hands of Rowland’s children, his staff, his security detail, and the husband of then Lt. Gov. Jodi Rell. The diversion was organized by State Trooper Eugene D’Angelo and was uncovered through a joint State Police and Department of Defense investigation.

In 2015 State Police Troop H and Troop C were among six Connecticut police departments singled out in a state report on racial bias in policing for having the most "significant disparities in their traffic stops data,” in particular traffic stop rates for Black and Hispanic drivers were much higher during the day when officers can easily visually establish the ethnicity of a driver before a stop than at night. The report was the most comprehensive report of its kind ever compiled by a state at the time of its release.

On December 31, 2018 Stavros Mellekas took over as the commander of the Connecticut State Police, replacing George F. Battle.

CSP Weapons
In 2012, CSP transitioned to the SIG Sauer P220R .45 ACP pistol. Prior to this, the SIG Sauer P229 had been issued since 1996.

In June 2022, CSP began transitioning to its new duty weapon, the Glock model 45 9mm, fitted with O Light weapon mounted lights and AmeriGLO Bold Night Sites. Troopers also transitioned to carrying only 2-spare magazines vs. 3 which were previously carried with the SIG 220R. Troopers were issued the appropriate Safariland ALS holster in high-gloss finish to complement the rest of their duty gear.

Organization
State Police Headquarters – Middletown

Troops
The CSP is divided into 11 troops, each of which has a Lieutenant Troop Commander, a master sergeant Executive officer, several patrol sergeants, a detective unit, and a full complement of personnel for patrol. The "resident troopers" in that troop area are also assigned to the troop. Additionally, each troop has its own dispatchers and clerical unit, and most have one or more mechanics to service the fleet.

Some troops, because of their location, are tasked primarily with highway patrol functions while other troops in more rural areas serve as rural police, i.e.: response to crimes, patrol of towns and neighborhoods, and providing police services to many Connecticut towns that do not have police departments of their own. (Connecticut has no County Sheriff Departments).

Troop A – Southbury
Troop B – Canaan
Troop C – Tolland
Troop D – Danielson
Troop E – Montville
Troop F – Westbrook
Troop G – Bridgeport
Troop H – Hartford
Troop I –   Bethany
Troop K – Colchester
Troop L – Litchfield
Troop H – BDL – Bradley International Airport in Windsor Locks, Troop H – Hartford at BIA supports Airport security functions as airport police, incident investigation, and backs up the airport management. Troop H also works with the Customs and Border Protection and the DEA.

Other Units:
 Statewide Organized Crime Investigative Task Force,
 Statewide Narcotics Task Force,
 Casino Unit, (primary law enforcement at casino)* (disbanded 3/06/2015)
 Welfare Fraud Unit,
 Criminal Intelligence Unit,
 Fire Marshal Division,
 Training Division,
 Licensing and Permits Section,
 Forensics Laboratory,
 Photography and Identification unit,
 Polygraph Unit
 Fleet management & Purchasing,
 The Emergency Services Unit, including the following subunits:
 Aviation,
 Bomb Squad,
 SCUBA (Dive Team),
 K-9,
 Tactical Units (SWAT),
 Mass Transit Security Explosive Detection Unit

The CSP also has a contingent of volunteer surgeons as well as a contingent of volunteer chaplains.

CSP Vehicles and Aircraft

The Fleet of the CSP incorporates non decal Ford Crown Victoria Police Interceptors, Taurus Base (sixth generation), Ford Explorer Base, Chevy Caprice PPV, motorcycles, and a Helicopter with fleet color livery consisting of navy blue, black, maroon, and dark-brown. As CSP allows off duty use of the fleet, vehicles are equipped with a removable Whelen liberty lightbar with the center pod replaced with a backlit "State Police" panel (known variants of this backlit panel exist for UConn police, and the CT DMV Enforcement Division, displaying "UConn Police" and "DMV" respectively), rear high mount TIR Whelen flashers with cruise light capability, 800 MHz Digital radio systems, Mobile Data Terminals (MDTs), and Mobile Video Cameras (MVRs). The CSP has also had a long history of using non-traditional unmarked patrol cars for enforcement such as Chevrolet Camaros, Ford Mustangs, Ford Explorers, Grand Nationals, Toyota Camrys, Honda Accords, Ram 1500s, Mazda MX-6s, Ford F-Series pickup trucks, and Dodge Chargers. Marked fleet vehicles (one per troop, white, CSP shield badging with blue and yellow pin stripping running the length of the car) are typically used for ceremonial purposed such as parades and community patrols).
The CSP utilizes Radar, Lidar (Laser), and VASCAR (Visual Average Speed Computer And Recorder) for speed enforcement.

In September 2022, The CSP utilized a helicopter from the Massachusetts National Guard to locate illegal cannabis cultivation sites.

Rank structure

Fallen officers
Since the establishment of the Connecticut State Police, 22 troopers have died in the line of duty.

See also

 List of law enforcement agencies in Connecticut
 State Police (United States)
 State Patrol
 Highway Patrol

References

External links
 Connecticut State Police Official Web Site
Unofficial Connecticut State Police site

State law enforcement agencies of Connecticut
Government agencies established in 1903
1903 establishments in Connecticut
Cannabis eradication